October 5 - Eastern Orthodox liturgical calendar - October 7

All fixed commemorations below celebrated on October 19 by Eastern Orthodox Churches on the Old Calendar.

For October 6th, Orthodox Churches on the Old Calendar commemorate the Saints listed on September 23.

Saints
 Holy and glorious Apostle Thomas (1st century)
 Virgin-martyr Erotheis of Cappadocia, by fire.

Pre-Schism Western saints
 Martyrs of Trier, innumerable martyrs slain for Christ in diverse ways, in Trier in Germany under Diocletian (287)
 Saint Faith (Foi. Foy), a holy virgin in Agen in the south of France, burnt to death under Maximian Herculeus (3rd century)
 Saint Romanus of Auxerre, Bishop of Auxerre in France (564)
 Saint Magnus of Oderzo, born in Venice in Italy, he became Bishop of Oderzo on the Adriatic and later of Heraclea (c. 660)
 Saint Cumine the White, born in Ireland, he became Abbot of Iona and wrote a life of St Columba (669)  (see also: February 24 )
 Saint Ceollach, Bishop of the Mercians or Mid-Angles, before going to Iona and then returning to Ireland (7th century)
 Saint Pardulphus (Pardoux), born in Sardent near Guéret in France, he became a hermit, then went to the monastery of Guéret where he became abbot (c. 738)
 Saint Aurea, a nun in Boves who became the abbess of a large convent (8th century)
 Saint Epiphania of Pavia, a nun at the convent of Santa Maria della Caccia, in Pavia in Italy (c. 800)

Post-Schism Orthodox saints
 Venerable Cindeus of Cyprus (Kendeas) the Wonderworker, one of the "300 Allemagne Saints" in Cyprus (12th century).
 The Holy Six "Allemagne Saints", in Cyprus (12th century):
 Hilarion the New; John; Joseph, at Lythrodontas; Calantius of Tamassos; Cassianos of Glypha; Cassianos of Axylou.
 New Monk-martyr Macarius of St. Anne’s Skete on Mt. Athos, at Prusa in Bithynia (1590)

New Martys and Confessors
 New Hieromartyr John Rybin, priest (1937)

Other commemorations
 Icon of the Most Holy Theotokos "O All-Hymned Mother".
 Glorification (1977) of Saint Innocent, the Metropolitan of Moscow and Enlightener of the Aleuts, Apostle to the Americas (1879)

Icon gallery

Notes

References

Sources 
 October 6/19. Orthodox Calendar (PRAVOSLAVIE.RU).
 October 19 / October 6. HOLY TRINITY RUSSIAN ORTHODOX CHURCH (A parish of the Patriarchate of Moscow).
 October 6. OCA - The Lives of the Saints.
 The Autonomous Orthodox Metropolia of Western Europe and the Americas (ROCOR). St. Hilarion Calendar of Saints for the year of our Lord 2004. St. Hilarion Press (Austin, TX). p. 74.
 The Sixth Day of the Month of October. Orthodoxy in China.
 October 6. Latin Saints of the Orthodox Patriarchate of Rome.
 The Roman Martyrology. Transl. by the Archbishop of Baltimore. Last Edition, According to the Copy Printed at Rome in 1914. Revised Edition, with the Imprimatur of His Eminence Cardinal Gibbons. Baltimore: John Murphy Company, 1916. pp. 308–309.
 Rev. Richard Stanton. A Menology of England and Wales, or, Brief Memorials of the Ancient British and English Saints Arranged According to the Calendar, Together with the Martyrs of the 16th and 17th Centuries. London: Burns & Oates, 1892. pp. 477.
Greek Sources
 Great Synaxaristes:  6 ΟΚΤΩΒΡΙΟΥ. ΜΕΓΑΣ ΣΥΝΑΞΑΡΙΣΤΗΣ.
  Συναξαριστής. 6 Οκτωβρίου. ECCLESIA.GR. (H ΕΚΚΛΗΣΙΑ ΤΗΣ ΕΛΛΑΔΟΣ).
  06/10/2016. Ορθόδοξος Συναξαριστής. 
Russian Sources
  19 октября (6 октября). Православная Энциклопедия под редакцией Патриарха Московского и всея Руси Кирилла (электронная версия). (Orthodox Encyclopedia - Pravenc.ru).
  6 октября по старому стилю / 19 октября по новому стилю. Русская Православная Церковь - Православный церковный календарь на 2016 год.

October in the Eastern Orthodox calendar